Victor Horrocks (1884 – 7 January 1922) was an English footballer who played football in Staffordshire, most notable with Stoke and Port Vale.

Career 
Horrocks played for local sides Goldenhill Wanderers, Stoke (without playing a first team game), Talke United, Sandyford and Goldenhill United, before signing with Burslem Port Vale in April 1905. He scored on his debut at outside-left in a 3–1 defeat by Bolton Wanderers at Burnden Park on 15 April. Six days later he scored in a 3–2 win over Gainsborough Trinity at the Athletic Ground, and ended the 1904–05 season with two goals in four Second Division games. He played 19 league and two FA Cup games in the 1905–06 campaign, and featured just ten times in the 1906–07 season as he was affected by injury. The club suffered a financial crisis and went into liquidation in summer 1907, and was forced to release all its players, including Horrocks. He returned to Goldenhill United, before re-joining Stoke. He opened his account for the "Potters" on 10 October 1908, claiming two goals in a 7–0 win over Wellington Town at the Victoria Ground, and went on to score six goals in 19 appearances in the 1908–09 season for the Birmingham & District League side. He featured in just one FA Cup game in the 1909–10 season and played only one Southern League game in the 1910–11 campaign. He scored a hat-trick in his final appearance for Stoke, a 3–0 win over Chesham Town on 5 November 1910. He rejoined Port Vale in September 1911. However, he played just four Central League games before getting released for a second time, most likely in 1912. He moved on to Congleton Town before dying in his late 30s.

Career statistics
Source:

References 

1884 births
1922 deaths
People from Goldenhill
Footballers from Stoke-on-Trent
English footballers
Association football midfielders
Stoke City F.C. players
Port Vale F.C. players
Congleton Town F.C. players
English Football League players
Southern Football League players